This is a list of PlayStation (PS1) games digitally re-released on the PlayStation Store in NA territories. These are the original games software emulated. Initially, downloadable PS1 titles were only available to play on PlayStation Portable (PSP). An update released in April 2007 enabled playing of these purchased PS1 titles on PlayStation 3 (PS3). Some titles can also be played on other PlayStation systems. PlayStation Vita (PSV) and PlayStation TV (PSTV) support the same titles as each other. Those released on PlayStation 4 (PS4) and PlayStation 5 (PS5) display in high-definition and may feature the addition of trophies. The PS4 and PS5 releases are bundled together, and the former is also playable on PS5 through backwards compatibility. If a downloadable PS1 game has been purchased for a device released prior to the PS4, the title is automatically added to the user's library on all devices for which there is a release.

For some of the PS1 titles lacking official support for PSV and PSTV, this was previously able to be circumvented by transferring the game to the device via a PS3. However, the ability to transfer games to and from a PS3 was lost in a 2022 update. Playing PS1 titles on a PSP or PSV does not support local multiplayer that was designed to use multiple controllers. However, PSTV supports this feature.

A red cell indicates that the title is no longer listed on the PlayStation Store, but might be located with the search function.

Released titles

See also
Lists of Virtual Console games
High-definition remasters for PlayStation consoles
List of PS one Classics (Japan)
List of PS one Classics (PAL region)

References

External links
PlayStation Store PSone Classics (North America)

1